Thaliapriset (Svenska Dagbladets Thaliapris)  is regarded to be one of Sweden's finest theatre awards  (together with the Eugene O'Neill Award and The Gunn Wållgren Award) and is given annually  to an actor, director or a theatre personality of the stage.  The annual scholarship was established in December 1951 by the daily Swedish newspaper Svenska Dagbladet. Throughout the years, some of the leading Swedish stage performers have received the award.

Recipients
2007 - Sven Ahlström
2006 - Stina Ekblad
2005 - Rickard Günther 
2004 - Birgitta Egerbladh 
2003 - Rickard Turpin
2002 - Philip Zandén 
2001 - Birgitta Englin 
2000 - Jasenko Selimovic 
1999 - Anna Pettersson
1998 - Lena Endre 
1997 - Thorsten Flinck 
1996 - Staffan Valdemar Holm
1995 - Linus Tunström 
1994 - Thommy Berggren 
1993 - Ingvar Hirdwall
1992 - Finn Poulsen
1991 - Lars Molin (filmmaker) 
1990 - Peter Oskarson 
1989 - Agneta Ekmanner 
1988 - Lars Rudolfsson
1987 - Eva Bergman
1986 - Suzanne Osten 
1985 - Sven Lindberg 
1984 - Margaretha Byström 
1983 - Per Mattsson 
1982 - Frej Lindqvist
1981 - Carl-Gustaf Lindstedt 
1979-1980 - Kim Anderzon 
1978 - Margareta Krook 
1977 - Börje Ahlstedt 
1976 - Olof Bergström 
1975 - Keve Hjelm 
1974 - Ulf Johansson 
1973 - Sven Wollter 
1972 - Jan Malmsjö 
1971 - Gunnel Lindblom 
1970 - Ernst Günther 
1969 - Jan-Olof Strandberg
1968 - Lennart Hjulström 
1967 - Ernst-Hugo Järegård 
1966 - Kerstin Tidelius
1965 - Ulla Sjöblom 
1964 - Gunnel Broström 
1963 - Toivo Pawlo
1962 - Bibi Andersson 
1961 - Ulla Smidje
1960 - Allan Edwall 
1959 - Gun Arvidsson 
1958 - Bengt Eklund
1957 - Ingmar Bergman 
1956 - Ulf Palme 
1955 - Max von Sydow 
1954 - Ingvar Kjellson
1953 - Gertrud Fridh 
1952 - Jarl Kulle 
1951 - Anita Björk

References

Swedish theatre awards
Awards established in 1951